Emeril is an American sitcom television series created by Linda Bloodworth-Thomason, starring Emeril Lagasse as himself. It aired on Tuesday nights on NBC from September 25, 2001, to December 11, 2001, from 8:00-8:30 EST. A total of 10 half-hour episodes were produced over one season, but only 7 aired.

Cast
Emeril Lagasse as himself
Lisa Ann Walter as Cassandra Gilman
Carrie Preston as B.D. Benson
Robert Urich as Jerry McKenney
Sherri Shepherd as Melva LeBlanc
Tricia O'Kelley as Trish O'Connell
Mary Page Keller as Nora Lagasse

Development
Having lost her development deal at CBS, Linda Bloodworth-Thomason sought to build a show around TV chef Emeril Lagasse. ABC passed on the show, even though Lagasse was appearing at that time on Good Morning America as a food correspondent.

NBC had high hopes for the show, as it was created by the once-respected Bloodworth-Thomason, however the show was savaged by many critics, one calling it a train wreck. Lagasse was said to be hesitant to participate in the project. The show was in the middle of filming when the September 11 terrorist attacks occurred; the show was scheduled to premiere on September 18, a week after the attacks, but was delayed by a week. Despite this, the opening sequence still featured the World Trade Center towers standing. Those involved with the show blamed the continuous news coverage of the terrorist attacks as the reason the show was never able to find much of an audience. Others blamed its non-acting leading man and unfunny scripts. The sitcom quietly went off the air by December 2001, with seven of its 10 episodes having been aired.

Bloodworth-Thomason had planned for the show to be "a very sophisticated, grown up comedy" that would "do for men what the women did for Designing Women." However, a regime change at NBC left the show without any defenders at executive levels.

After the poorly received first pilot, the show was revamped turning the focus from Emeril's fictionalized home life to life on the set of a fictional version of Lagasse's Food Network show. A food stylist was added to the cast, as well as the additional casting of Robert Urich as Emeril's agent. The show was produced by Mozark Studios in association with NBC Studios.

The kitchen on the show was fully functional, and Lagasse would cook for the cast and staff.

Episodes

Reception
The E! show 101 Biggest Celebrity Oops ranked the sitcom at No. 51. The LA Times called the show "pretty dreadful." USA Today was kinder to the show, giving it 2 1/2 out of 4 stars. The review cited the show's improvement, stating that it may yet be a great sitcom and "but it's moving in the right direction, notch by notch. Like many series of late, this sitcom for star cable chef Emeril Lagasse has gone through a near-total overhaul since its barely-a-work-in-progress pilot was previewed to general dismay". The Complete Directory to Prime Time Network and Cable TV Shows 1946–Present noted that show was at its best when Emeril was cooking.

Awards
The show received an Emmy nomination for Art Direction For A Multi-Camera Series.

In popular culture
The retooling of the show was parodied on the October 13, 2001 episode of Saturday Night Live.
The show was also referenced on Madtv in a sketch starring Christopher Titus.

References

External links

NBC original programming
2000s American sitcoms
Cultural depictions of American men
Cultural depictions of cooks
2001 American television series debuts
2001 American television series endings
Television series created by Linda Bloodworth-Thomason
Television series by Universal Television